Cheshmeh Saran (also Romanized as Cheshmeh Sārān; also known as Mīr Ākhvond, Qal‘eh Milleh Khurd, Qal‘eh Mīr Ākhur, Qal‘eh-ye Mīleh Khvor, Qal‘eh-ye Mīr Ākhor, Qal‘eh-ye Mīr Ākhowr, Qal‘eh-ye Mīr Ākhūnd, Qal‘eh-ye Mīr Ākhvond, and Qal‘eh-ye Mīr Ākhvor) is a village in Sefidkuh Rural District, Samen District, Malayer County, Hamadan Province, Iran. At the 2006 census, its population was 151, in 43 families.

References 

Populated places in Malayer County